Cybil is a feminine personal name. It may refer to:

 Cybil Bennett, character in the Silent Hill media franchise
 Cybil (programming language)

See also

 Cybill Shepherd, American actress
 Cybill, American TV series
 Cybils Award, in children's literature
 Sibille
 Sibyl (disambiguation)
 Sibylle (disambiguation)